Rico Linhas Aéreas Flight 4815 was a domestic scheduled passenger flight from São Paulo de Olivença, northeast Brazil to Manaus, the capital of Amazonas state. On 14 May 2004, the aircraft operating the flight, an Embraer EMB 120 Brasilia, crashed into the dense Amazon rainforest while on approach to Manaus. All 33 people on board were killed. 

It was the deadliest accident involving an Embraer EMB 120 Brasilia and the deadliest in the airline's history, surpassing the previous crash of Rico Linhas Aéreas Flight 4823, which occurred 2 years before the crash of Flight 4815.

Incident
The flight was operated by Manaus-based regional airline Rico Linhas Aéreas. The Embraer 120ER Brasília registration PT-WRO had 30 passengers and 3 crew on board, all of them Brazilians. At the time, the weather was reportedly good.  from the airport, as the aircraft was following the landing pattern to Manaus, air traffic control vectored the flight out of the landing pattern to the left to make room for a priority medical flight. At 18:34, Flight 4815 radioed they were at  when the aircraft suddenly dropped off radar. Controllers tried to restore contact with the plane, to no avail. A search and rescue team was assembled, and later found scattered human remains and fragments of plane near the airport. Eyewitnesses reported that they saw a fireball falling during the crash.

References

External links 

Final Report - CENIPA

Accidents and incidents involving the Embraer EMB 120 Brasilia
Aviation accidents and incidents in 2004
Aviation accidents and incidents in Brazil
2004 disasters in Brazil
May 2004 events in South America
Airliner accidents and incidents with an unknown cause